Ariosoma multivertebratum is an eel in the family Congridae (conger/garden eels). It was described by Emma Stanislavovna Karmovskaya in 2004. It is a marine, deep water-dwelling eel which is known from the Marquesas Islands, in the eastern central Pacific Ocean. It is known to dwell at a depth range of 300–460 metres. Males can reach a maximum total length of 54.2 centimetres.

The species epithet "multivertebratum" refers to the eel's possession of a larger quantity of vertebrae than others in the genus Ariosoma.

References

multivertebratum
Taxa named by Emma Stanislavovna Karmovskaya
Fish described in 2004